Yawhen Kisyalyow (born 27 February 1993) is a Belarusian professional footballer who is currently playing for Gorki.

References

External links

Profile at Pressball

1993 births
Living people
People from Babruysk
Sportspeople from Mogilev Region
Belarusian footballers
Association football defenders
FC Belshina Bobruisk players
FC Khimik Svetlogorsk players
FC Orsha players
FC Gorki players